Bilgin Özçalkan (born 31 December 1976), also known by his stage name Ceza (Turkish for 'punishment'), is a Turkish rapper and songwriter.

Early works

In 1995, Özçalkan started a group called U.C.S and performed with this group until about 1998. His group Nefret got signed under Hammer Music in 2000, and the album Meclis Ala – İstanbul was released. In 2001, Özçalkan proceeded to release the album Anahtar. The title track on this album that holds the same name as the album itself was the first one that came with a music video. The album was a great success, and Özçalkan performed at many concerts from it.

However, Özçalkan's big breakthrough came in 2004. He was invited to one of the biggest rock festivals in Turkey, namely RockIstanbul, and was asked to perform on stage there. He was able to showcase his rap music in an environment that held the largest Turkish popular music acts.

In 2005, at the Turkish rock music festival Rock 'n Coke, Ceza let out a profanity-laden freestyle rap directed at the singer Kıraç, who had made comments about rap not being real music.

After these two projects, Özçalkan had a featuring with artist Mercan Dede in his album Su ("Water").

Personal life

Özçalkan was born on 31 December 1976 in Üsküdar, Istanbul, but he was registered on 1 January 1977 in his birth certification. He worked for 8 years as an electrician before he started rapping. He is the first and only Turkish singer who won a MTV Music Award in 2007. Again in 2007, he created his own clothing brand called Evin Delisi.

His sister, Ayben Özçalkan Ülkü is also a rapper.

Discography

Solo albums

Split albums
with Dr. Fuchs

with Killa Hakan

Singles
 "Açık Ara Bul Kon" (2009)
 "Artık Suç Değil Sevgi İşleyin" (2010)
 "Sende Biraz Delisin" (2011)
 "Türk Marşı" (2012)
 "Mind Right" (feat. Kaan) (2016)
 "Denizci" (2018)
 "Fight Kulüp" (feat. Killa Hakan & Ezhel & Ben Fero) (2019)
 "Komedi v Dram" (feat. Sayedar & Önder Şahin) (2019)
 "Beatcoin" (2019)
 "Yak" (with Tepki) (2020)
 "Yeni Mesaj" (2020)

International (as featured artist)

Filmography

References

External links
Official website
Official YouTube channel
 
 Ceza on Spotify

1976 births
Living people
Turkish rappers
Turkish male singers
Turkish-language singers
MTV Europe Music Award winners
Turkish lyricists